Mikhail Yurievich Shekhtman ( Hebrew:מיכאיל שכטמן, born February 25, 1989) is an Israeli-Russian conductor and pianist.

Early life and education 
Mikhail was born in Moscow in 1989 to a Russian father and Jewish mother, both being biochemists working at the Moscow State University.

It was Avram Shechtman, Mikhail's grandfather who deeply loved classical music and, possessing a tenor voice and often singing to young Misha at home as well as playing LP recordings, inspired him to study music.

Mikhail has a sister Ekaterina, who is choir conductor and artistic director of the Intrada ensemble.

Mikhail's great-grandmother's sister was Emma Shadkhan (Emma S. Woytinski), wife of Wladimir S. Woytinsky, advisor to president Franklin D. Roosevelt.

Shekhtman started to play the piano at the age of six and performed her first solo concert at the age of seven. Since early childhood, Mikhail has been studying piano with Elena Aleksandrova.

Throughout 2004—2008 Shekhtman studied at the Moscow State Conservatory Academic Music College with Professor Vera Khoroshina, friend of Emil Gilels and one of the favourite female students of professor Heinrich Neuhaus (teacher of S. Richter and E. Gilels). He also studied organ with Professor Natalia Gureeva. Subsequently, he continued studies at the State Tchaikovsky Conservatory with Professor Pavel Nersessian, graduating in 2013. Mikhail attended masterclasses by Dmitri Bashkirov, Teodor Currentzis & Michail Jurowski.

In April 2019, Mikhail adopted the family name of his grandfather — Shekhtman.

Performances and collaborations 

Shekhtman is one of the most sought-after musicians of his generation. He has been equally successful working in symphonic, operatic and chamber genres and has been awarded with German OPUS-Klassik and Bavarian radio prize.

Shekhtman collaborates with leading concert venues -  Leipzig Gewandhaus, Berlin Philharmonie, Vienna Konzerthaus, Zurich Tonhalle, Paris Theatre des Champs Elysées, Hamburg Laeizhalle, Melbourne Recital Centre, Seattle Benaroya Hall, Seoul Lotte Concert Hall, The Mariinsky Theatre, Grand Hall of Moscow Conservatory, Great Hall of St-Petersburg Philhamonie and festivals - The Lucerne Easter Festival, Gstaad Menuhin Festival, Verbier Festival, Bad Kissingen Festival.

He performs with prominent soloists - Augustin Hadelich, Ilya Gringolts, Ildar Abdrazakov, Olga Peretyatko, Aida Garifullina, Maria Guleghina, Maxim Vengerov, Behzod Abduraimov, Jonathan Tetelman, Julia Lezhneva, Pavel Nersessian, Helena Tarosian, Anahit Stelmashova, Valentine Michaud.  He assisted Daniel Harding, Sir Antonio Pappano and Danielle Gatti.

Shekhtman collaborates with orchestras, including Leipzig Gewandhausorchester, Seoul Philharmonic, National Orchestra of Spain, Il Giardino Armonico, Russian National Orchestra, St-Petersburg Philharmonic, The Mariinsky Theatre and newly based Russian National Youth Symphony Orchestra. As pianist he performed under Herbert Blomstedt, Santtu-Mathias Ruvali and James Gaffigan. His concerts and recordings have been broadcast via national television and worldwide through Medici.tv, BBC Radio 3, France Musique & Bavarian Radio.

Press 

“It was worth the entire concert just to hear her sing that one song in perfect unison with the talented pianist, Mikhail Shekhtman. The beauty of his playing, his majesty, gives chills to us all. They feed off each other beautifully and the dynamics showcase the incredible musicianship of the performers” — Victoria Kennedy.

“Wonderfully delicate Mozart touch” – Herbert Blomstedt (Adventliche Concert at the Leipzig Gewandhaus)

"Extraordinary sound" - Pizzicato Luxembourg (Remy Franck)

"Astonishing conductor & pianist"  - RG.ru (Maria Babalova)

"The real star of the evening was the conductor - brilliant and charismatic Mikhail Shekhtman, who brought the house down leading the Symphony Orchestra of India" – Khushroo N Suntook  (chairman and founder, NCPA) 21/11/2019 - SOI, Mumbai - Opening of the Festival 50 Years National Centre for Performing Arts)

Recordings 

Shekhtman made his first professional recording released on Decca conducted Concerto Köln for Julia Lezhneva's new world premiere recording of Graun Opera Arias on Decca (2017)

The CD was featured as 'Disc of the Month' of the Bavarian Radio.

Shekhtman's concert pianist repertoire ranges from Scarlatti and Couperin to Prokofiev and Shostakovich with a focus towards works by J.S. Bach, W. A. Mozart, L. van Beethoven and Schubert.

References

Further sources 
 
 
 
 
 
 
 
 
 

1989 births
Living people